Schwantesia is a genus of plant in the family Aizoaceae. It is named in honor of the German botanist and archaeologist Gustav Schwantes (1881 - 1960).

Schwantesia species resemble those genera within the family Aizoaceae to which they are most closely related; namely Lithops, Dinteranthus and Lapidaria.

Species include:

 Schwantesia constanceae

References

 
Aizoaceae genera
Taxonomy articles created by Polbot
Taxa named by Kurt Dinter